Thaddeus Amat y Brusi C.M., or in Spanish Tadeu Amat y Brusi (December 31, 1811 – May 12, 1878) was a Spanish Roman Catholic cleric who became the first Bishop of Los Angeles, in California.

Early life
Amat was born in Barcelona, Catalonia, Spain on December 31, 1811, to Pedro Amat and Maria Brusi. He entered the Congregation of the Mission, commonly called the Vincentian Fathers, in 1832 and was ordained a priest of the Congregation on December 23, 1837, in Paris, France, by Hyacinthe-Louis de Quélen, the Archbishop of Paris. He was then sent to the United States as a missionary in Louisiana. He later served as a master of novices for his congregation in Missouri and Pennsylvania.

Bishop
On 28 July 1853, while serving as the Rector of St. Charles Borromeo Seminary in Philadelphia, he was appointed the Bishop of Monterey in California. The diocese's previous bishop, Joseph Sadoc Alemany, O.P., had been promoted to archbishop of the newly created Archdiocese of San Francisco.

Amat was consecrated as a bishop in Rome on March 12, 1854, by Cardinal Fransoni, the Prefect of the Sacred Congregation for the Propagation of the Faith.  Recognizing the growth of Los Angeles and the decline of Monterey, he petitioned the Holy See to move the see to Los Angeles and to be known as Bishop of Los Angeles. Amat arrived in the pueblo of Los Angeles in 1855. On July 7, 1859, the diocese was renamed the Diocese of Monterey-Los Angeles. The Co-Cathedral of Saint Vibiana was founded in Los Angeles and consecrated during the episcopacy of Amat, and he himself brought back from Rome the relics of its patron saint, which were interred in a sarcophagus above the cathedral's main altar.

Father Amat traveled to Rome in 1869 to attend the First Vatican Council called upon by Pope Pius IX.  On June 28, 1870, Father Amat was an orator during the official mass of the 78th Congregation celebrated in the Vatican.

The Council was interrupted when King Victor Emmanuel II attacked Rome and deposed Pope Pius IX. Pius IX suspended the Council indefinitely on October 20, 1870.

Dispute over the Californian missions
Amat came into conflict with Friar José González Rubio, O.F.M., of the Mission Santa Barbara, over the control of the mission after President Abraham Lincoln returned the California missions to the Catholic Church.  The Franciscans claimed, on the basis of both Church law and historical grounds, that the missions were rightfully under their direct jurisdiction and not that of the diocese, and that, in the case of Mission Santa Barbara, they should hold the deed.

Institutions founded
Amat founded some of the first schools in Los Angeles and asked his fellow Vincentians to open St. Vincent's College (now known as Loyola Marymount University).  It was the first institution of higher learning in Southern California. He welcomed the Franciscan Brothers of Ireland into his diocese to work in the parochial schools, as well as the Daughters of Charity and the Sisters of the Immaculate Heart of Mary.

Amat formally consecrated Calvary Cemetery on North Broadway (formerly Buena Vista Street) at Bishops Road in 1866. The area had been set aside in 1844. The graves in Calvary Cemetery were moved to the present cemetery location to make way for Cathedral High School. He founded the 30-acre Santa Clara Cemetery in Oxnard in 1874. St. Mary's Cemetery (3.69 acres) in San Buenaventura was acquired by Amat in 1862 and blessed in 1884. He dedicated the Gothic Revival brick chapel to Saint Nicholas at the Workman Family Cemetery in the City of Industry.

Death
Amat died on May 12, 1878, at Los Angeles, California, and was succeeded by his coadjutor bishop, Francisco Mora y Borrell, who (like Alemany and Amat) was also Catalan.  He was originally buried in the crypt of the co-cathedral in Los Angeles, but, due to earthquake damage, is now buried in the bishop's crypt of the Cathedral of Our Lady of the Angels, which replaced it in 2002.

Bishop Amat Memorial High School in La Puente, California, is named for him and his original tombstone is located at the school's chapel.

References
 Who Was Who in America: Historical Volume, 1607–1896.  Chicago: Marquis Who's Who, 1967.

External links
 Roman Catholic Archdiocese of Los Angeles
  Vatican Biography (in French) on Father Amat
  Father Amat listed as an orator during the Vatican Mass of 28 June 1870

1810 births
1878 deaths
Clergy from Barcelona
Vincentians
Spanish Roman Catholic missionaries
Spanish expatriates in the United States
Roman Catholic missionaries in the United States
19th-century Roman Catholic bishops in the United States
19th century in Los Angeles
Bishops from Catalonia
Spanish Roman Catholic bishops in North America
Vincentian bishops
Roman Catholic Archdiocese of Los Angeles
Roman Catholic Diocese of Monterey in California
Participants in the First Vatican Council
Burials at the Cathedral of Our Lady of the Angels
Spanish expatriates in France